Stoyan Ivanov (Bulgarian: Стоян Иванов; born 14 May 2001) is a Bulgarian footballer who plays as a midfielder for Bulgarian First League club Beroe Stara Zagora.

Career
On 21 February 2019, he made his professional debut in Beroe's 1–0 victory over Etar, replacing Ivan Minchev in the stoppage time. On 29 May 2019, Ivanov signed his first professional contract with the club.

Career statistics

Club

References

External links
 

2001 births
Living people
Bulgarian footballers
Association football midfielders
First Professional Football League (Bulgaria) players
Second Professional Football League (Bulgaria) players
PFC Beroe Stara Zagora players
PFC Spartak Varna players
FC Yantra Gabrovo players
Sportspeople from Stara Zagora